Cobitis punctilineata is a species of ray-finned fish in the family Cobitidae.
It is found only in Greece.
Its natural habitats are rivers and intermittent rivers.
It is threatened by habitat loss.

References

Cobitis
Taxa named by Teodor T. Nalbant
Fish described in 1996
Taxonomy articles created by Polbot